Hutoupi Scenic Area is a park in Xinhua District, Tainan, Taiwan.

History
The park consists of a reservoir which was established in 1846 for the purpose of supplying water to the farm areas around it for irrigation. In 1954, the Literature Committee of Tainan County Government chose the park as one of the top eight wonders of Tainan County.

Architecture
The park features the Tiger Moon Suspension Bridge and a pavilion at the center of the lake island.

Facilities
The park also features facilities such as accommodation, barbecue, bicycle renting, camping, conference room, food service etc.

Transportation
The park is accessible by bus from Tainan Station of Taiwan Railways.

See also
 List of parks in Taiwan

References

External links

  

1846 establishments in Taiwan
Parks established in 1846
Parks in Tainan